The Illinois Prairie Community Foundation (IPCF) serves McLean, Livingston, DeWitt, Logan and adjacent areas of Tazewell, Woodford, LaSalle, Ford and Piatt counties.

The Community Foundation helps connect donors with those causes they wish to benefit. It facilitates charitable giving for individuals and businesses, helps organizations with their endowment funds, serves as fiscal agent for charitable community projects, and is a catalyst for innovative charitable solutions to meet area needs. A donor advised fund at the Community Foundation is an economical and simplified version of a private foundation.

Support is provided in the fields of human services, education, environment, economic development, arts and culture, and health among others.

The IPCF is in full compliance with the national standards developed by the Council on Foundations.

The foundation celebrated its 10-year anniversary in 2009.

Types of Funds Supported
Donor Advised Funds: This type of fund, either endowment or pass-through, allows the funding donor to remain actively involved with grantmaking.

Unrestricted Endowment Funds: Ideal for forward-thinking individuals, organizations, and corporations who know the needs and strengths of the community may change.

Field of Interest Endowment Funds: A gift to be used to address a specific need or area of concern.

Endowment: A simple way for donors to perpetuate their gifts to the specific charitable organization(s) of their choice, often ones with which they have been involved during their lifetimes.

Pass-Through Project or Agency Funds: The Community Foundation serves as the financial conduit for special community projects.

Board of directors
President – Richard Stroyan
Vice President – Steve Timmerman
Secretary – Susan Hoblit
Treasurer – Diane Fishering
Directors – Martha Ceja, Harold Frobish, Paul Harmon, Darrell Hartweg, Susan Hoblit, John Hutchinson, Tim O. Ives, Gene Jontry, Danny Liefel, Karla Lohnes, Gretchen Monti, Joni Painter, Jennifer Sedbrook, Bruce Unterman

History
In 1996, Carol Reitan, Alan Sender and Drake Zimmerman began preparing a community foundation for McLean County. Research on existing community foundations, talks with community leaders, and meeting the legal requirements to establish a not-for-profit 501(c)(3) organization came to fruition two years later. Mayors Judy Markowitz of Bloomington and Kent Karraker of Normal, and McLean County Board Chairperson Gary Riss agreed to serve as the first incorporating board. The Community Foundation of McLean County was officially established on November 6, 1998. Gifts of $296,900 were placed in the Peoria Area Community Foundation of Central Illinois before the end of 1998 in an account held on behalf of CFMC. These were Donor Advised Funds, established and donated before CFMC was in a position to receive gifts.

By June 2003, the Community Foundation of McLean County was serving donors and making grants in Livingston and DeWitt Counties and surrounding areas. Permanent 501(c)(3) status had been achieved. Assets had grown to almost $600,000. The Board of Directors decided a name change was in order. Before action could be taken, Logan County was added to the list of locations being served and assets had grown to $800,000. In April, 2004, we officially became Illinois Prairie Community Foundation, Inc. Since 2004, the IPCF has grown dramatically. In fiscal 2007 (July 1, 2006, to June 30, 2007) the Foundation and its donors distributed $484,841 in grants. Total assets as of December 31, 2007, were $5,981,822.

References

External links 

 

Non-profit organizations based in Illinois
Bloomington, Illinois
Community foundations based in the United States